Merle Woo is an American academic, poet and activist who has been described as "a leading member of the Radical Women and the Freedom Socialist Party". Her essay "Letter to Ma" was selected for inclusion in the 1981 feminist anthology This Bridge Called My Back.

Early life 
Woo was born in San Francisco, California on October 24, 1941 to a Chinese father and a Korean mother, Richard and Helene Woo. 
Woo attended  Catholic schools, as her parents believed them to be better than public schools.

Education 
In 1965, Woo received a B.A. in English from San Francisco State University. In 1969, Woo received a M.A. in English literature from San Francisco State University. While in college Woo met and married her husband, with whom she had two children. It was while she was studying for her M.A. that Woo witnessed the 1968–69 Third World Student Strikes at the University, which had a huge impact on her becoming an activist. Woo also believes that these strikes had a positive impact on her ability to later find work.

By the late 1970s Woo had come out as a lesbian.

Career 
After completing her degree in 1969 Woo began working at San Francisco State University with their Equal Opportunity Program, where she taught Lesbian Literature, among other classes. She was later given a job offer by the University of California, Berkeley, where she began teaching in 1978 until she was fired in 1982 due to openly criticizing the way the Ethnic Studies Department was run and stating that they were a result of right wing activities. She fought against the dismissal and was briefly reinstated in 1984, upon which point she formed the Merle Woo Defense Committee to ensure that all issues would be heard. In 1986 Berkeley declined to renew Woo's teaching contract, a move she believed to be discrimination and retaliation. Woo once again successfully fought against the dismissal, winning a union arbitration against the university in 1989. She went on to teach at San Francisco State University and San Jose State University.

In 1977 Woo performed in Lonny Kaneko's play Lady is Dying. She also participated in a performance group named Unbound Feet with Nellie Wong and Kitty Tsui, which dispersed in 1981. Woo has also published a play, Home Movies: A Dramatic Monologue, which has been described as an "outcry against both sexism and racism".

Bibliography 
 Yellow Woman Speaks: Selected Poems (1986, Radical Women Publishing)

External Links

References

American feminist writers
American poets
American poets of Asian descent
Lesbian feminists
Living people
1941 births
American writers of Chinese descent
American writers of Korean descent
American women poets
American LGBT people of Asian descent
Socialist feminists
Lesbian academics
Activists from San Francisco